Death in Bloodhound Red is a mystery novel by American author Virginia Lanier. It was published by Pineapple Press on 1 March 1995 and went on to win the Anthony Award for Best First Novel in 1996.

Plot introduction
The novel is set in and around the Okefenokee Swamp in Georgia. The main character, Jo Beth Sidden, is an outspoken  feminist bloodhound trainer who assists law enforcement with search and rescue. When she is accused of attacking her ex-husband, Jo Beth takes matters into her own hands.

References 

1995 American novels
American mystery novels
Anthony Award-winning works
Novels set in Georgia (U.S. state)